Shaikh Sama'al-Din Kamboh (also known as Hazrat Shaikh Alamsayakh Makhdoom Sama'al-Din Kamboh) was born in 1405 AD in Multan, Punjab, Pakistan. Shaikh Sama'al-Din Kamboh was a Sufi of the Suhrawardi order and came to Delhi during the reign of Sultan Bahlol Lodi (d 894/1488) and became the patron saint of the Lodi dynasty. His father Maulana Shaikh Fakhrudin was a venerable religious leader of that era. Makhdoom Shaikh Sama'al-Din had been the royal spiritual adviser or Pir, first to emperor Sultan Bahlol Lodi, and later to Sultan Sikandar Lodi. He commanded greatest respect amongst the entire Muslim spiritual and religious leaders and was one of the greatest Ulema Shaikhs of his times. The mazar of Hazrat Shaikh Sama'al-Din is located in Delhi where the Zubairies of Panipat used to assemble every year for offering Fateha in pre-independence days. Spiritual discipline apart, Shaikh Sama'al-Din was a scholar of traditional sciences and imparted instructions as a professional teacher to a large number of students. One of his famous students who rose to eminence was Shaikh Jamali Kamboh.

Shaikh Sama'al-Din was author of (1) a glossary on Iraqi's Lam'at and (2) a tract on Sufism, Miftah ul-Asrar.

References

15th-century deaths
Year of birth unknown
People from Multan